Bekodik is an area of Chagai District located in the Balochistan province of Pakistan. In October 2006, the world's fifth largest ore reserves of gold and copper were discovered there.

References